Shunpei Hashioka (born July 7, 1911 in Osaka, Japan – 	August 7, 1978) is a Japanese-Chinese boxer who competed in the 1936 Summer Olympics. In 1936 he was eliminated in the quarter-finals of the bantamweight class after losing his fight to Stig Cederberg.

External links
Shunpei Hashioka's profile at Sports Reference.com

References

1911 births
Year of death missing
Bantamweight boxers
Olympic boxers of Japan
Boxers at the 1936 Summer Olympics
Japanese male boxers
Japanese people of Chinese descent
People from Osaka Prefecture
Sportspeople from Osaka Prefecture
People from Osaka
Sportspeople from Osaka